Jo Gilis (born 5 February 2000) is a Belgian professional footballer who plays for OH Leuven and OH Leuven U23.

Club career
Gilis played his first match for OH Leuven on 14 April 2018, coming on as a substitute for Nikola Storm in a 0-2 win at Waasland-Beveren.

Personal life
Gilis has two older sisters, Nele Gilis and Tinne Gilis, who are both professional squash players representing Belgium.

References

2000 births
Living people
Association football midfielders
Belgian footballers
Belgium youth international footballers
Oud-Heverlee Leuven players
S.C. Eendracht Aalst players
Lierse Kempenzonen players
K.S.K. Heist players
Belgian Pro League players
Challenger Pro League players